The 2006 Washington State House elections took place on November 7, 2006. Voters in all 49 of Washington's legislative districts voted for their representatives.  Washington State Senate elections were also held on November 7.

Overview

Election results

District 1

District 2

District 3
In 2004, Alex Wood was challenged by David Stevens and won with 61.61% of the vote.

District 4
Seat 1
Larry Crouse (R) - Incumbent

In 2004, Larry Crouse was challenged by Jim Peck (D) and won with 61.55% of the vote.

Seat 2
Lynn Schindler (R) - Incumbent
Ed Foote (D) - Challenger

In 2004, Lynn Schindler was challenged by Ed Foote (D) and won with 65.85% of the vote.

District 5
Seat 1

Jay Rodne (R)

In 2004, Jay Rodne was challenged by Jeff Griffin (D) and Keith Kemp (L) and won with 52.36% of the vote.

Seat 2

Glenn Anderson (R)

In 2004, Glenn Anderson was challenged by Barbara de Michele (D) and Beau Gunderson (L) and won with 54.07% of the vote.

District 6
Seat 1

John W. Serben (R) - Incumbent
Donald A. Barlow (D) (WINNER)
Website: https://web.archive.org/web/20060827122542/http://www.electdonbarlow.com/
Info: Spokane Spokesman Review

In 2004, John Serben ran against Don Barlow (D) for an open seat (vacated when Brad Benson ran for State Senate) and won with 51.90% of the vote.

Seat 2

John Ahern (R) - Incumbent (WINNER)
Barbara Lampert (D)

In 2004, John Ahern was challenged by Douglas Dobbins (D) and won with 60.56% of the vote.

District 7
Seat 1

Bob Sump (R) - Incumbent
Jack Miller (D) - Challenger
Website: https://web.archive.org/web/20060525060604/http://www.electjackmiller.com/

In 2004, Bob Sump was challenged by Jack Miller (D) and Dave Wordinger (L) and won with 64.12% of the vote.

Seat 2

Joel Kretz (R) - Incumbent

In 2004, Joel Kretz ran against Yvette Joseph (D) for an open seat (vacated when Cathy McMorris ran for Congress) and won with 65.15% of the vote.

District 8
Seat 1

Shirley Hankins (R) - Incumbent

In 2004, Shirley Hankins was challenged by Rick Dillender (D) and won with 73.28% of the vote.

Seat 2

Larry Haler (R) - Incumbent
Website: http://www.larryhaler.com

In 2004, Larry Haler was challenged by Jerad Koepp (D) and won with 69.82% of the vote.

District 9

Seat 1
Steve Hailey (R)
Joe Schmick (R)
Glen R. Stockwell (R)
Tedd Nealey (R)
Caitlin Ross (D)

Current incumbent Don Cox (R) is not seeking re-election in 2006. 

Seat 2
David W. Buri (R) - Incumbent

District 10
Seat 1

Christopher Strow (R)

Seat 2
Barbara Bailey (R) - Incumbent
Tim Knue (D) - Challenger

District 11

Position 1
Zack Hudgins (D) - Incumbent

Position 2
Bob Hasegawa (D) - Incumbent
 John Potter (R)

District 12
Position 1
Cary Condotta (R) - Incumbent
Position 2
Mike Armstrong (R) - Incumbent

District 13
Position 1
Judith (Judy) Warnick (R)
Max Golladay (R)
Current incumbent Janéa Holmquist (R) is running for State Senator.

Position 2
Bill Hinkle (R) - Incumbent

District 14
Position 1
Mary Skinner (R) - Incumbent
Don Hinman (D)
Position 2
Ron Bonlender (D)
Sandra Belzer Swanson (R)
James Keightley (R)
Harold F. Koempel (R)
Charles R. Ross (R)
Glen Blomgren (R)

Current Incumbent James Clements (R) is not seeking re-election in 2006.

District 15
Position 1
Bruce Chandler (R) - Incumbent
Glen Howard Pinkham (D)
Position 2
Dan Newhouse (R) - Incumbent
William J. Yallup (D)

District 16
Position 1
Maureen Walsh (R) - Incumbent
Patrick Guettner (R)
George Fearing (D)

Position 2
Bill Grant (D) - Incumbent
Sheryl Cox (R)
Kevin Young (R)

District 17

Seat 1

Jim Dunn (R) - Incumbent
Pat Campbell (D) - Challenger
Jack Burkman (D) - Challenger

Seat 2

Deb Wallace (D) - Incumbent
Paul Harris (R) - Challenger

District 18
Position 1
Richard Curtis (R) - Incumbent
Jonathan Fant (D)
Position 2
Ed Orcutt (R) - Incumbent
Julie McCord (D)

District 19
Position 1
Dean Takko (D) - Incumbent
Tim Sutinen (R) - Challenger

Position 2
Brian Blake (D) - Incumbent
Keath Huff (R) - Challenger

District 20
Position 1
Richard DeBolt (R) - Incumbent, House Minority Leader
Mike Rechner (D)

Position 2
Gary C. Alexander (R) - Incumbent

District 21
Position 1
Mary Helen Roberts (D) - Incumbent
Position 2
Brian Sullivan (D) - Incumbent

District 22
Seat 1

Brendan W. Williams (D) - Incumbent

Seat 2

Sam Hunt (D) - Incumbent
Kevin Bonagofski (R)

District 23
Position 1
Sherry Appleton (D) - Incumbent
Earl Johnson (R)
Position 2
Beverly Woods (R) - Incumbent
Christine Rolfes (D)

District 24
Seat 1

James Buck (R) - Incumbent
Kevin Van de Wege (D) - Challenger

James Buck was challenged by Van de Wege in 2002, and won with 51%.

Seat 2

Lynn Kessler (D) - Incumbent, House Majority Leader

District 25
Position 1
Joyce McDonald (R) - Incumbent
Jonathan E. Bristol - (D)
Position 2
Dawn Morrell (D) - Incumbent
Wally Nash (R)

District 26
Seat 1

Patricia Lantz (D) - Incumbent
Beckie Krantz (R) - Challenger

Seat 2
Larry Seaquist (D)
Ronald Boehme (R)
Trent England (R)

Current Seat 2 Representative Derek Kilmer (D) is running for the State Senate seat left open by the retirement of Bob Oke, which leaves the race for this seat an open race.

District 27
Seat 1

Dennis Flannigan (D) - Incumbent
Stan Barker (politician) (R)

Seat 2
Jeannie Darneille (D) - Incumbent
Bret Edensword (R)

District 28
Position 1
Troy Kelley (D) (cw)
Don Anderson (R) (cw)
Stan Flemming (R)

Current incumbent Gigi Talcott (R) is not seeking re-election in 2006.

Position 2
Tami Green (D) - Incumbent (cw)
Bob Lawrence (R)
Jim Oliver (R)

District 29
Position 1
Steve Conway (D) - Incumbent
Position 2
Steve Kirby (D) - Incumbent

District 30
Position 1
Mark Miloscia (D) - Incumbent
Anthony Kalchik (R)
Position 2
Skip Priest (R) - Incumbent
Helen Stanwell (D)

District 31
Seat 1

Dan Roach (R) - Incumbent
Karen Willard (D) - Challenger

Seat 2

Jan Shabro (R) - Incumbent
Christopher Hurst (D) - Challenger and former House member

District 32
Position 1
Maralyn Chase (D) - Incumbent
Norine Federow (R)

Position 2
Ruth Kagi (D) - Incumbent
Steve Gibbs (R)

District 33
Position 1
Shay Schual-Berke (D) - Incumbent
Mike Cook (R)
Position 2
Dave Upthegrove (D) - Incumbent

District 34
Position 1
Eileen L. Cody (D) - Incumbent
Position 2
Joe McDermott (D) - Incumbent
Savun Neang (R)

District 35
Position 1
Kathy Haigh (D) - Incumbent
Marco Brown (R)

Position 2
William 'IKE' Eickmeyer (D) - Incumbent
Randy Neatherlin (R)

District 36
Position 1
Helen Sommers (D) - Incumbent

Position 2
Mary Lou Dickerson (D) - Incumbent

District 37
Position 1
Sharon Tomiko Santos (D) - Incumbent
Position 2
Eric Pettigrew (D) - Incumbent
Kwame Wyking Garrett (R)

District 38
Position 1
John McCoy (D) - Incumbent
Kim Halvorson (R)

Position 2
Mike Sells (D) - Incumbent

District 39
Seat 1

Dan Kristiansen (R) - Incumbent
Scott Olson (D) - Challenger

Seat 2

Kirk Pearson (R) - Incumbent

District 40
Position 1
Dave Quall (D) - Incumbent
Yoshe Revelle (R)

Position 2
Jeff Morris (D) - Incumbent

District 41
Position 1
Fred Jarrett (R) - Incumbent
Dale Murphy (D)

Position 2
Judy Clibborn (D) - Incumbent
Erik Fretheim (R)

District 42
Seat 1

Doug Ericksen (R) - Incumbent
Website: http://dougericksen.com/
Jasper MacSlarrow (D) - Challenger
Website: http://www.votejasper.com/

Seat 2

Kelli Linville (D) - Incumbent
Craig Mayberry (R) - Challenger

District 43

Seat 1
Dick Kelley (D)  Kelley in 2006
Jamie Pedersen (D) People for Pedersen
Bill Sherman (D) billsherman.com
Stephanie Pure (D) People for Pure
Jim Street (D)  JimStreet.org
Lynne Dodson (D) LynneToWin.org 
Hugh Foskett (R)
Linde Knighton (Progressive) voteknighton.org

Ed Murray is stepping down from his House seat to run for the State Senate.

Rough road ahead for non-Democrat candidates in 43rd

Seat 2
Frank Chopp (D) - Current Speaker of the House
Will "Chopper" Sohn (R) Will Sohn For Representative

District 44
Position 1
Hans Dunshee (D) - Incumbent
Mike Hope (R)

Position 2
John Lovick (D) - Incumbent
Robert Legg (R)

District 45

Seat 1
Roger Goodman (D)
Jeffrey Possinger (R)
Current Rep. Toby Nixon (R) is running for the open Senate seat.

Seat 2
Larry Springer (D) - Incumbent
Tim Lee (R)

District 46
Position 1
Jim McIntire (D) - Incumbent
Website: https://web.archive.org/web/20060829232052/http://jimmcintire.com/

Position 2
Phyllis Gutierrez Kenney (D) - Incumbent
Website:

District 47
Seat 1
Geoff Simpson (D) - Incumbent
Website: http://www.votesimpson.com/ 
Donna Watts (R)
Website: https://web.archive.org/web/20070502190510/http://www.donnawatts.org/

Seat 2
Pat Sullivan (D) - Incumbent
Website: http://www.votepatsullivan.com/
Andrew Franz (R)
Website: https://web.archive.org/web/20061106034048/http://www.andrewfranz.org/

District 48
Seat 1

Ross Hunter (D) - Incumbent, Ross Hunter
Nancy Potts (R) Nancy Potts 

Seat 2

Deb Eddy (D) Deb Eddy
Santiago Ramos (D) (cw)
Brett Olson - (R) Bret Olson for 48th District Representative

Seat 2 became an open seat on March 14, 2006 when Rodney Tom announced his candidacy for the Senate, switching parties from Republican to Democrat in the process.

District 49

References

See also

House of Representatives
Washington House of Representatives elections
Washington House